Durmaz is a Turkish surname. Notable people with the surname include:

 Berkan Durmaz (born 1997), Turkish basketball player
 David Durmaz (born 1981), Swedish footballer
 Ercan Durmaz (born 1965), Turkish-German actor
 Jimmy Durmaz (born 1989), Swedish footballer

Turkish-language surnames